Michel Maurer (12 October 1904 – 23 November 1983) was a Luxembourgian boxer who competed in the 1924 Summer Olympics. In 1924 he was eliminated in the second round of the light heavyweight class after losing his fight to John Courtis of Great Britain.

References

External links
 profile

1904 births
1983 deaths
People from Differdange
Luxembourgian male boxers
Light-heavyweight boxers
Olympic boxers of Luxembourg
Boxers at the 1924 Summer Olympics